David Kennedy, 10th Earl of Cassilis (bef. 1734 – 18 December 1792), was a Scottish peer, the third son of Sir John Kennedy, 2nd Baronet by Jean Douglas.

He succeeded to the titles of 10th Earl of Cassilis, 12th Lord Kennedy and 5th Baronet Kennedy on 30 November 1775 on the death of his elder brother Thomas, the 9th Earl, who had died without male issue. He held the office of representative peer of Scotland from 1776 to 1790. It was the 10th Earl who ordered the rebuilding of Culzean Castle on the Ayrshire coast.

Lord Cassilis never married, and the baronetcy became extinct on his death; the other titles passed to a distant cousin, Archibald Kennedy, 11th Earl of Cassilis, who lived in New York.

References

Earls of Cassilis
1792 deaths
Members of the Parliament of Great Britain for Scottish constituencies
British MPs 1768–1774
Year of birth uncertain
Place of birth missing
Scottish representative peers
David